Sakura (also known as Higobana) is a Hawaiian card game played using hanafuda.

How to win
The goal of the game is to out-score the other players (or teams) by having the highest number of points. Points are won by "capturing" individual point cards and holding yakuscoring combinationsat the end of each round.

Dealing the cards

Note: when dealing, deal half of the face up cards first, then half of the "cards in hand" to each player, then finish dealing the rest of the face up cards and in-hand cards.  This will help randomize the "hard-to-shuffle" deck.

Game play
Sakura is a turn-based game that includes 48 cards that can be in one of five different states:
 Cards that are face up on the table, for all players to see;
 Cards that players are holding in their hands that only they can see;
 Cards that are worth points individually or arranged by yaku sets and have been claimed by a player, face up for all players to see;
 Cards that have been played but are worth no points: the kasu pile;
 Cards that have not yet been played yet, stacked face down in a single pile: “the mountain.”

During turn a player takes the following actions:
 The player must discard a card from his/her hand
 If this card is in the same suit or family as one of the face up cards, the player then claims that card as his own, placing it face up in front of him/her;
 If this card does not match the suit or family of any face up cards, then that card remains face up for someone else to claim.
 The player must then flip over the next face down card on “the mountain”
 This card should then be played, following the same discarded card rules listed above;
 The round ends when “the mountain” is empty or if players run out of cards to play.

Note: when playing the Lightning or Gaiji card, you can claim any face up card of any family.  When the next point card of this “claimed” family is claimed by another player – or if it is turned up from the mountain – ownership of that point card transfers to the player that used the Lightning card

Scoring Overview
Based on the cards you've claimed:
 Award yourself 5-20 points for each point card that you've captured, based on the values in the next section

Adjusted by the cards your opponents have claimed:
 Deduct 50 points from your total score for each yaku that they captured

Scoring Cards

Scoring Yaku

References

Hawaii culture
Fishing card games
Hanafuda card games